From This Moment On! is the fourth album led by saxophonist Charles McPherson recorded in 1968 and released on the Prestige label.

Reception

Allmusic awarded the album 3 stars with its review by Scott Yanow stating, "Not one of McPherson's most essential releases, as the material and arrangements are just not that strong; nevertheless, the altoist still plays well, and his fans will want to pick up this reissue".

Track listing 
All compositions by Charles McPherson except as indicated
 "Little Sugar Baby" - 4:14     
 "Once in a Lifetime" (Leslie Bricusse, Anthony Newley) - 5:11     
 "The Good Life" (Sacha Distel, Jack Reardon) - 6:40     
 "Like the Way You Shake That Thing" - 3:18     
 "From This Moment On" (Cole Porter) - 3:32     
 "Without You" (Osvaldo Farrés) - 7:10     
 "You've Changed" (Bill Carey, Carl Fischer) - 6:18

Personnel 
Charles McPherson - alto saxophone
Cedar Walton - piano
Pat Martino - guitar
Peck Morrison - bass
Lenny McBrowne - drums

References 

Charles McPherson (musician) albums
1968 albums
Prestige Records albums
Albums produced by Don Schlitten